The 1979–80 British Ice Hockey season featured the Northern League, the Inter-City League and English League North.

Murrayfield Racers won the Northern League, Liverpool Leopards won the English League North and Richmond Flyers won the Inter-City League. Murrayfield Racers won the Icy Smith Cup.

Northern League

English League North

Inter-City League

Icy Smith Cup

Final
Murrayfield Racers defeated Solihull Barons 21-2

Autumn Cup

First round

Scottish section

English section

Playoffs
Semifinals
Billingham Bombers - Glasgow Dynamos 6:3, 7:2
Murrayfield Racers - Durham Wasps 6:3, 1:0
Final
Murrayfield Racers - Billingham Bombers 10:1, 13:6

References

British
1979 in English sport
1980 in English sport
1979 in Scottish sport
1980 in Scottish sport